Villa Maria College is a private Roman Catholic college in Buffalo, New York. It was founded in 1960 by the Felician Sisters.

History
The college was initially a teacher-training center for sisters in the education apostolate and was established as an affiliate of the Catholic University of America. In 1961, a provisional charter was secured from the Board of Regents of the State of New York to grant Associate in Arts and Associate in Applied Science degrees to women religious.

The Paul William Beltz Family Art Gallery

The Paul William Beltz Family Art Gallery is located on the ground floor of the Main Building on campus. It gives students a professional space to display and share their work on campus. The gallery features exhibitions from students, faculty, as well as local and regional artists.

Athletics
The Villa Maria athletic teams are called the Vikings. The college is a member of the United States Collegiate Athletic Association (USCAA), competing as an independent.

Villa Maria competes in seven intercollegiate varsity sports: Men's sports include basketball, cross country and soccer; while women's sports include basketball, bowling, cross country and soccer. Club sports include co-ed cheerleading.

References

External links
 Official website
 Official athletics website

Education in Buffalo, New York
Educational institutions established in 1961
Universities and colleges in Erie County, New York
1961 establishments in New York (state)
Catholic universities and colleges in New York (state)
USCAA member institutions